Malekabad-e Hammanlu (also Romanized as Malekābād-e Ḩammānlū; also known as Malekābād) is a village in Chahardangeh Rural District, Chaharbagh District, Savojbolagh County, Alborz Province, Iran. At the 2006 census, its population was 15,296, in 3,717 families.

References 

Populated places in Savojbolagh County